James Mullaney is an American writer. Mullaney was ghostwriter and later credited writer of 26 novels in The Destroyer paperback-novel series. He is currently the author of The Red Menace novel series as well as the Crag Banyon Mysteries series.

Biography
Jim Mullaney is a Shamus Award-nominated author of nearly 40 books, as well as comics, short stories and novellas. His work has been published by New American Library, Gold Eagle/Harlequin, Marvel Comics, Tor and Moonstone Books. He is currently co-writing with Jim Uhls (Fight Club) the screenplay to the Destroyer film adaptation for Sony, to be directed by Shane Black (Lethal Weapon, Iron Man 3). He was born in Massachusetts, the last of six children.

Writing

The Destroyer
The first Destroyer novel to which Mullaney contributed was #88: The Ultimate Death; he then went on to become the sole writer of the series for issues #111-131. When the series moved from Gold Eagle to Tor Books, he and series co-creator Warren Murphy shared coauthor credit on The Destroyer, beginning May 2007. Mullaney stayed with the series until it ended its run at Tor in August 2008. Sony Pictures has announced that Mullaney has been hired, along with Jim Uhls, to co-write the script for a new Destroyer movie, which is currently in development.

Other work
Mullaney has two series of his own.  The Red Menace is an adventure series that centers on Patrick "Podge" Becket, a retired communist-fighter and secret agent from the 1950s who returns to crime-fighting in the 1970s, aided by his friend and partner Dr. Thaddeus Wainwright.  The first novel, Red and Buried, was released on September 15, 2011 to mostly positive reviews. The paperback of Red and Buried was issued in paperback by Moonstone Books in 2013.

Four more E-books in the Red Menace series have been released, Drowning In Red Ink, Red the Riot Act, A Red Letter Day, and Red on the Menu.  In 2021, Bold Venture Press brought out the first three works in paperback and will most likely bring the rest out as well.  A sixth and seventh are listed.

Mullaney's second series surrounds the comic adventures of private investigator Crag Banyon; the first book, One Horse Open Slay was published on December 13, 2011 to positive reviews.  The second Crag Banyon Mystery, Devil May Care, was released May 2012. A third Crag Banyon Mystery, Royal Flush, was 2012, followed by Sea No Evil and Bum Luck in 2013.  They are all available in paperback. A sixth Banyon, Flying Blind was published in June, 2014.

Devil May Care was a 2013 Shamus Award finalist in the Best Indie P.I. Novel category.

Mullaney has also worked on Iron Fist for Marvel Comics.

The Destroyer series 
 The Destroyer 88: The Ultimate Death (written with Will Murray and Ric Meyers)
 The Destroyer 111: Prophet of Doom
 The Destroyer 112: Brain Storm
 The Destroyer 113: The Empire Dreams (alternate title: Sins of the Fatherland)
 The Destroyer 114: Failing Marks
 The Destroyer 115: Misfortune Teller
 The Destroyer 116: The Final Reel
 The Destroyer 117: Deadly Genes
 The Destroyer 118: Killer Watts
 The Destroyer 119: Fade to Black
 The Destroyer 120: The Last Monarch
 The Destroyer 121: A Pound of Prevention
 The Destroyer 122: Syndication Rites
 The Destroyer 123: Disloyal Opposition
 The Destroyer 124: By Eminent Domain
 The Destroyer 125: The Wrong Stuff
 The Destroyer 126: Air Raid
 The Destroyer 127: Market Force
 The Destroyer 128: The End of the Beginning
 The Destroyer 129: Father to Son
 The Destroyer 130: Waste Not, Want Not
 The Destroyer 131: Unnatural Selection
 The New Destroyer #1: Guardian Angel
 The New Destroyer #2: Choke Hold
 The New Destroyer #3: Dead Reckoning
 The New Destroyer #4: Killer Ratings

The Red Menace series
 Red and Buried
 Drowning In Red Ink
 Red the Riot Act
 A Red Letter Day
 Red on the Menu
 Red Devil (NYP)
 The Ruses are Red (NYP)

The Crag Banyon series
 One Horse Open Slay (A Crag Banyon Mystery)
 Devil May Care (A Crag Banyon Mystery)
 Royal Flush (A Crag Banyon Mystery)
 Sea No Evil (A Crag Banyon Mystery)
 Bum Luck (A Crag Banyon Mystery)
 Flying Blind (A Crag Banyon Mystery)
 Shoot the Moon (A Crag Banyon Mystery) [forthcoming]

References

External links
 
Author page on Facebook
Crag Banyon page on Thrilling Detective website

American spy fiction writers
Living people
Ghostwriters
American male novelists
Novelists from Massachusetts
21st-century American novelists
21st-century American male writers
Year of birth missing (living people)